Hare Tonic is a 1945 Warner Bros. cartoon in the Looney Tunes series, directed by Chuck Jones and written by Tedd Pierce.  It stars Bugs Bunny and Elmer Fudd, making this the second cartoon directed by Jones to co-star the two (the first being Elmer's Pet Rabbit). Voice characterizations are by Mel Blanc and Arthur Q. Bryan.

Plot
Elmer Fudd has purchased Bugs Bunny at a local grocery store (with a sign visible in the window offering a special on "Fresh Hare") and is taking him home to make a meal. As he walks along, he sings the tune of "Shortnin' Bread", substituting "Wabbit Stew". Bugs emerges from Elmer's basket, munching on a carrot that was in there with him, and asks, "Eh, whatcha got in the basket, doc?" Elmer replies, "I got me a wabbit! I'm gonna cook me a wabbit stew!" Bugs states his "love" of rabbit stew (despite being a rabbit himself) and then begs to see Elmer's rabbit. When Elmer opens his basket and finds it empty (Bugs had quickly climbed out), Bugs pushes him into his own basket and then sings the tune Elmer had been singing — but then Elmer realizes he has been tricked, and so he re-reverses the switch.

Once at home, Bugs easily secures his escape by distracting Elmer, tricking him into thinking the phone has rung. However, just as he's about to leave, he decides that the setup's too easy and he just can't leave. He decides to stay and heckle his would-be devourer. Bugs fakes a radio broadcast that warns of the dread disease "rabbititis", which is contracted from rabbits "sold within the last three days" and which causes people to see spots and have "delusions assuming the characteristics of rabbits", which is followed by the onset of schizophrenia and depersonalization disorder. This frightens the gullible Elmer and he informs Bugs that he is free to leave. Bugs, however, decides he doesn't want to leave by saying "Oh, no, Doc. Wouldn't think of it. We're gonna brew a stew, remember?", only to make Elmer back away, forcing him to hide on top of his door: "Oh no! Pwease, Mr. Wabbit! Go away! Don't come any cwoser! D-Don't come near me! Nooooooooo!". Bugs, thinking he has B.O., sniffs his glove and tells the audience "Oh, goodness! Don't tell me I offend." just as Elmer pleads with Bugs to "Make twacks. Scuwwy away. SCWAM!" to which Bugs angrily replies as he leaves "Okay! I can take a hint! I know when I'm not wanted! Goodbye!". But when Bugs returns, Elmer reminds him that Bugs has to "scwam", but Bugs points to a new sign on the front door that states "Quarantined for Rabbititus  (RAbbititis). No one may leave premises."

Thus Bugs stays to torment Elmer, and many hijinks ensue, including Bugs posing as Elmer's shower faucets {"Gurgle, gurgle. Why don't ya' pay ya' water bill, Doc?"} and a doctor ("Dr. Killpatient", parodying Dr. Kildare), painting a room with red, yellow and blue spots to make Elmer think he sees spots before his eyes and pretending to be Elmer's reflection in the mirror (like the mirror scene in the Marx Brothers' film, Duck Soup) and his own rabbity image reflected at him in a mirror that's really just Bugs after the glass has been removed. And when Dr. Killpatient (Bugs) tests Elmer's reflexes, Elmer goes into a familiar Russian kick dance, and Bugs decides to join him in a busby hat and boots. Finally, Elmer sees Bugs' game and chases him out of the house with a shotgun. But Bugs quickly halts the chase and, in an unusually lengthy breaking of the fourth wall, even by Bugs' standards, he convinces Elmer that members of the audience are now afflicted with rabbititis by saying "Hey, wait a minute. Wait a minute. Look, the people out there in the audience - the lady there with the long ears. They're getting longer all the time. And the guy back there in the seventeenth row with the cute tomato - he's gettin' all fuzzy. Yeah, they've got it. Everybody out there's got rabbititis! Yaah!" which causes Elmer to flee back into his house in a terror of panic.

Bugs then addresses the audience and says the whole thing was "just a gag, of course" and that if the audience really had rabbititis, they would see swirling red and yellow spots, whereupon red and yellow spots are seen swirling on the screen, and the underscore starts to build dramatically. Immediately after Bugs says, "And then suddenly, everything'd go black!" the screen does suddenly go black, and the music stops abruptly and dramatically, followed by a second or two of dark silence. Bugs snickers and the cartoon ends. The cartoon saying and eating carrot and saying "And that's the end!" as the cartoon ends.

Production notes
The title is a play on "hair tonic", a type of patent medicine, reinforced by Bugs' portrayal of a fake doctor at a few points in the picture. A bottle of "hare tonic" appeared as a prop in a 1946 cartoon, The Big Snooze.

This cartoon marks one of the few times Bugs addresses Elmer by name, albeit in the guise of "Dr. Killpatient", who addresses him as "Mr. Fudd". Despite their frequent cinematic encounters, many of their cartoons are played as if they had never met before.

Bugs impersonates Frankenstein's monster to chase Elmer.

This and Baseball Bugs feature a Bugs Bunny variant of the then-usual closing, where, instead of Porky Pig busting out of a drum, Bugs does, proclaiming "...And that's the end!" while chomping on a carrot. Both American and European Turner "dubbed" prints retain the original ending card, with the Turner "dubbed" notice appearing under the card.

Despite this being a Looney Tunes short, the Merrie Melodies rings are shown even when Bugs pulls down the Looney Tunes card. This also happens in Hare Conditioned. In Baseball Bugs and Buccaneer Bunny, the "Warner Bros. Pictures Inc." card has the Merrie Melodies rings, but the Looney Tunes title card has the Looney Tunes rings.

Sources

Home media
This cartoon is found on Volume 3 of the Looney Tunes Golden Collection, and on Volume 1 of the Looney Tunes Platinum Collection.

References

External links

1945 films
1945 short films
1945 animated films
1940s Warner Bros. animated short films
Looney Tunes shorts
Bugs Bunny films
Elmer Fudd films
Films about health care
Films about hoaxes
Short films directed by Chuck Jones
Films scored by Carl Stalling
1940s English-language films